The LCDR R1 class was a class of 0-4-4T locomotives on the South Eastern and Chatham Railway (SECR), which were based on an existing London, Chatham and Dover Railway (LCDR) design.

History
For many years, the two constituents of the South Eastern and Chatham Railway SECR - the London, Chatham and Dover Railway and the South Eastern Railway (SER) - had both favoured the 0-4-4T wheel arrangement for suburban and stopping passenger trains. The SER's most recent design was James Stirling's Q class 0-4-4T, which had been produced between 1881 and 1897, whereas the LCDR had the more modern R class 0-4-4T of William Kirtley's design, which dated from 1891. When more 0-4-4T engines were required soon after the formation of the SECR in 1899, the company had two options: to build more of either or both of the existing designs, or to produce a new design. It was intended that a range of standard designs would be produced which would be suitable for use across the whole SECR system, however until these were ready, it was decided to order more of the LCDR's existing R class design, but with modifications.

Numbering
Fifteen of these locomotives were built by Sharp, Stewart and Company in 1900; their SECR numbers were 696–710 – nos. 696–705 were for use on the former LCDR routes, whilst nos. 706–710 were for the old SER system. Originally they were included in the R class, but were separated into a new R1 class in January 1901. No more were built, because by the time that further 0-4-4Ts were required, Wainwright's H class design was ready; it owed much to the R1 class.

Renumbering
The R1 class locos were renumbered three times: to A696-710 by the Southern Railway (SR) from 1923; to 1696-1710 by the SR from 1931; and to 31696-31710 by British Railways from 1948.

Withdrawal
Two (nos. A701 and A702) were withdrawn in 1929, and withdrawal of the rest occurred between 1949 and 1956.

Notes

References

R1
0-4-4T locomotives
Railway locomotives introduced in 1900
Sharp Stewart locomotives
Scrapped locomotives
Standard gauge steam locomotives of Great Britain